David de Lindsay, Lord of Barnweill and Byres (died 1279), was a Scottish knight and crusader. A minor baronial lord, he was the son of David de Lindsay and held lands in East Lothian and South Ayrshire. He became Justiciar of Lothian under Alexander II of Scotland in 1241. This position had been held by his father earlier in the century.

He rose to further national prominence as a supporter of the Comyns during the minority of Alexander III of Scotland, becoming a regent in 1255 and royal Lord Chamberlain of Scotland in 1255 serving until 1257.

He went on the Ninth Crusade with Prince Edward, and died in Egypt, c. 1279.

Family
David married Margaret de Lindsay, possibly of the Lamberton Lindsay family, they are known to have had the following known issue: 
Alexander Lindsay of Barnweill (died 1308), had issue.
William Lindsay of Symington, married Alicia Lockhart, had issue.

Citations

References
 Barrow, G.W.S., "The Justiciar", The Kingdom of the Scots, (Edinburgh, 2003), pp. 68–111
 Cameron, Sonja, "Lindsay family of Barnweill, Crawford, and Glenesk (per. c.1250–c.1400)", Oxford Dictionary of National Biography, Oxford University Press, 2004 , accessed 19 May 2007
 Macquarrie, Alan, Scotland and the Crusades, (Edinburgh, 1997)
 

Year of birth unknown
1279 deaths
People from East Lothian
People from South Ayrshire
Christians of Lord Edward's crusade
Scottish soldiers
Lord Chamberlains of Scotland
David